Joona Riekkinen (born March 5, 1999) is a Finnish professional ice hockey defenceman currently playing for KalPa of the Finnish Liiga.

Riekkinen made his Liiga debut with KalPa on October 13, 2017 against KooKoo, his only game of the 2017–18 Liiga season. He then played thirteen games during the 2018–19 Liiga season and scored his first goal on October 10, 2018 against SaiPa.

References

External links

1999 births
Living people
Finnish ice hockey defencemen
Iisalmen Peli-Karhut players
KalPa players
People from Kuopio
Sportspeople from North Savo